The House of Dolgorukov is a princely Russian family of Rurikid stock. They are a cadet branch of the Obolenskiy family (until 1494 the rulers of Obolensk, one of the Upper Oka Principalities) and as such claiming patrilineal descent from Mikhail of Chernigov (d. 1246).

The founder of the Dolgorukov branch of the Obolenskiy is Prince Ivan Andreevich Oblenskiy (15th century), who for his vengefulness was given the nickname of Долгорукий Dolgorukiy, i.e. "far-reaching". Obolensk was incorporated into the expanding Grand Duchy of Moscow in 1494, and the house of Dolgorukov became a powerful noble family in Tsardom of Russia and the Russian Empire.

List of members
Members of the House of Dolgorukov include:

Maria Dolgorukaya (d. 1580), a wife of Ivan IV
Grigorij Ivanovich Menshoi Tchyort ("the Devil") Dolgorukov (Князь Григорий Иванович Меньшой Чёрт Долгоруков), died after 1598, governor under Ivan the Terrible.
Aleksey Grigorevich Tshertyonok ("Little Devil") Dolgorukov  (Князь Алексей Григорьевич Чертёнок Долгоруков), died 1646.
Maria Dolgorukova (d. 1625), first wife of Michael I
 (near 1610–1682), military leader known for victories during the Russo-Polish war, boyar (1648). Killed during the Moscow uprising of 1682.
 (1664–1707), Russian colonel, killed at the start of Bulavin Rebellion
Vasily Vladimirovich Dolgorukov (1667–1746), Russian Field Marshal
Vasily Lukich Dolgorukov (1672–1739), Russian diplomat and minister
Alexey Grigoryevich Dolgorukov (died 1734), cousin of Vasily Lukich, father of Ekaterina Alekseyevna
Vladimir Petrovich Dolgorukov (1696–1761), Russian General Governor of Livonia and Estonia
Ekaterina Alekseyevna Dolgorukova (1712–1747), betrothed to Emperor Peter II of Russia
Vasily Mikhailovich Dolgorukov-Krymsky (1722–1782), Russian general and governor of Moscow
Yuri Vladimirovich Dolgorukov (1740–1830), Russian general-in-chief, author of valuable memoirs
Mikhail Petrovich Dolgorukov (1780–1808), Russian colonel
Helene Pavlovna Dolgorukova (1790–1860), grandmother of Helena Blavatsky and Sergei Witte
Dimitri Ivanovich Dolgorukov (1797–1867), career diplomat
Vasily Andreyevich Dolgorukov (1804–1868), Russian minister of war
Pyotr Vladimirovich Dolgorukov (1816–1868), Russian nobleman and historian
Helena Blavatsky (1831–1891), occultist, spirit medium and author who co-founded the Theosophical Society
 governor-general (mayor) of Moscow from 1865 to 1891
Catherine Dolgorukova (1847–1922),  morganatic wife of Alexander II of Russia
Pavel Dolgorukov (1866–1927), prominent liberal politician prior to 1917
Pyotr Dmitriyevich Dolgorukov (1866–1951), Russian liberal politician
Vasily Alexandrovich Dolgorukov (1868–1918), Court Marshal to Nicholas II

See also
Yuri Dolgorukiy

External links 
 
 Долгоруков. Russian Biographic Lexicon